Lawrence Glenn "Flip" Cornett (October 29, 1957 – September 5, 2004) was an American funk guitarist and bassist.

Cornett was born in Lincoln Heights, Ohio. He was a self-taught musician.

Cornett appears as rhythm guitarist and bassist on the album, Bootsy Collins and Bootsy's New Rubber Band: Keepin' dah Funk Alive 4-1995, recorded live in Tokyo.

Cornett also performed with George Clinton-Parliament-Funkadelic, Roger Troutman, Reggie and Vincent Calloway of Midnight Star, Kenneth "Babyface" Edmonds, Sly Fox, 400 Years of What, and Black Rose Express. He recorded with Stephanie Mills, Patti LaBelle, and Kenny "Babyface" Edmonds.

American funk guitarists
American male guitarists
P-Funk members
1957 births
2004 deaths
People from Lincoln Heights, Ohio
American male bass guitarists
Guitarists from Ohio
20th-century American bass guitarists
21st-century American bass guitarists
20th-century American male musicians